William Reid Stark (born 27 May 1937 in Glasgow, Scotland) is a Scottish former professional footballer who played as a forward. He played in Football League most notably for Colchester United, making 95 league appearances, and he also made appearances for Crewe Alexandra, Carlisle United, Luton Town, Chesterfield and Newport County.

References

External links

Player Profile - Billy Stark

1937 births
Living people
Footballers from Glasgow
Scottish footballers
Association football forwards
Rangers F.C. players
Crewe Alexandra F.C. players
Carlisle United F.C. players
Colchester United F.C. players
Luton Town F.C. players
Chesterfield F.C. players
Newport County A.F.C. players
Matlock Town F.C. players
Boston United F.C. players